The Men's 5000 metres event was held on 31 January. 10 athletes participated.

Schedule
All times are Almaty Time (UTC+06:00)

Records

Results
Legend
DSQ — Disqualified

References

Men 5000